Charcoal (Charlie Burlingame) is a fictional character appearing in American comic books published by Marvel Comics. The character has been depicted as a member of the Thunderbolts and was created by a comic book fan for a "Create-A-Villain" contest sponsored by Marvel and Wizard Magazine and the alter-ego was created by Kurt Busiek.

The character first appeared in Thunderbolts #19 (Oct 1998).

Publication history
Charcoal was created to be a villain, by means of a Wizard magazine contest. However, Wizard Entertainment failed to establish certain legal specifics in the language of their contest rules, leaving the ownership of the character's copyright in question (normally in such a situation, steps would be taken to ensure that, unless otherwise stated, such a character's copyright would legally belong to the comic's publisher). Furthermore, Wizard Entertainment reportedly failed to provide the contest winner with other prizes promised along with the winning character's appearance in a Marvel comic. Feeling undercompensated, Charcoal's creator attempted to legally claim the copyright for the character from Marvel. Meanwhile, writer Fabian Nicieza had decided to kill off Charcoal and resurrect him later on. Because of the legal issues, Marvel told Nicieza it "wasn't worth" bringing the character back.

Fictional character biography

Charles "Charlie" Burlingame's father Calvin moved around a great deal and had trouble finding work, until he attended a rally of the Imperial Forces of America. Calvin joined that organization and took his son with him. Arnim Zola, working for the Imperial Forces, discovered that Charlie possessed the genetic potential to develop superhuman powers and facilitated the youngster's transformation into Charcoal the Burning Man. As part of a group called the Bruiser Brigade, Charcoal fought the Thunderbolts as an enemy, but joined the team soon after.

He was subsequently killed in battle with Graviton.

Power and abilities
Charlie Burlingame can transform into a being seemingly composed of charcoal. He has the ability to manipulate heat and reshape himself into any carbon form, including flaming incendiary or rock-hard diamond. He could use his flaming form to fly. He could sense the location of any tiny broken off piece of himself, allowing him to plant tracers on opponents and follow them.

References

External links
 Charcoal at Marvel Wiki
 Charcoal at Comic Vine
 Charcoal at Marvel Appendix
 World of Black Heroes: Charcoal Biography

Comics characters introduced in 1998
African-American superheroes
Fictional characters with fire or heat abilities
Marvel Comics characters who are shapeshifters
Marvel Comics characters with superhuman strength
Marvel Comics mutates
Marvel Comics superheroes
Marvel Comics supervillains